The athletics competition at the 1953 Summer International University Sports Week was held at the Stadion Rote Erde in Dortmund, West Germany, between 13 and 16 August.

Medal summary

Men

Women

Medal table

References
World Student Games (Pre-Universiade) - GBR Athletics 

Athletics at the Summer Universiade
1953 Summer International University Sports Week
Uni
1953 in West German sport
International athletics competitions hosted by West Germany